Inno al Re, composed by Giovanni Paisiello in 1787, was the national anthem of the southern European kingdom of the Two Sicilies from 1816 until the Italian unification in 1860.

Lyrics
These are the lyrics which were used during the time of the kingdom. In the example, below the name of Ferdinand could be replaced by whichever Bourbon king was ruling the Two Sicilies at the time. The "double throne of his fathers" is a reference to the fact that Naples and the Sicily were two kingdoms, hence the name of the country "Two" Sicilies.

"Back from the Past"
A new set of lyrics has been written by Neapolitan songwriter Riccardo Pazzaglia to go along with the original composition. This variation of the anthem is known as Ritornati dal passato, meaning Back from the Past. It has been officially adopted as the anthem of the Two Sicilies independence movement in Southern Italy called "Movimento Neoborbonico (7 sept. 1993). Below are the lyrics written by Riccardo Pazzaglia;

References

External links
Inno al Re - anthem of Two Sicilies

Historical national anthems
Kingdom of the Two Sicilies
Compositions by Giovanni Paisiello
Royal anthems
Italian anthems
European anthems
1816 establishments in the Kingdom of the Two Sicilies
1861 disestablishments in the Kingdom of the Two Sicilies